Adrien Gaston Calley Saint-Paul de Sinçay (9 July 1854 – 19 March 1938) was a Belgian industrialist and equestrian. He was appointed an officer of the Legion of Honour.

Personal life
Calley Saint-Paul de Sinçay was born in Angleur on 9 July 1854, into a family with French bourgeois roots. He studied at the Faculty of Law of Paris, graduating in 1879. He married a Russian countess, Hélène Bloudoff; they had a daughter named Marie-Antoinette.

Career
Calley Saint-Paul de Sinçay joined the Société des Mines et Fonderies de Zinc de la Vieille-Montagne in 1877. He became secretary of the board of directors in 1884, and succeeded his father as managing director in 1890.

Calley Saint-Paul de Sinçay was president of the Chambre Française de Commerce et de l'Industrie de Belgique.

Equestrian
Calley Saint-Paul de Sinçay competed in the equestrian mail coach event at the 1900 Summer Olympics.

References

External links

1854 births
1938 deaths
Belgian industrialists
Belgian male equestrians
Olympic equestrians of Belgium
Equestrians at the 1900 Summer Olympics
Sportspeople from Liège Province
Officiers of the Légion d'honneur
Belgian people of French descent